Fortov (from форт meaning fortress) is a Slavic masculine surname, its feminine counterpart is Fortova. It may refer to:
Iveta Zelingerová (née Fortová in 1972), Czech cross country skier
Vladimir Fortov (1946–2020), Russian physicist

See also
3813 Fortov, a minor planet

Russian-language surnames